The Powder Tower or Powder Gate is a Gothic tower in Prague, Czech Republic. It is one of the original city gates. It separates the Old Town from the New Town.

History

The Powder Tower is one of the original 13 city gates in Old Town, Prague. Its construction began in 1475. The tower was intended to be an attractive entrance into the city, instead of a defensive tower. The foundation stone was placed by Vladislav II. The city council gave Vladislav II the tower as a coronation gift. While it was being built, it was called the New Tower.  The look of the tower was inspired by the work of Peter Parler on the Charles Bridge.

Vladislav II had to relocate due to riots, so the tower building stopped. He returned in 1485 to live back in Prague Castle, where he lived for the rest of his life, along with the rest of the Kings of Bohemia who lived in Prague. Kings would not return to use the tower or Royal Court until using it for coronation ceremonies starting again in 1836, where they would pass through the tower to go to St. Vitus Cathedral.

The gate was used to store gunpowder in the 17th century, hence the name Powder Tower or Powder Gate. The gate suffered considerable damage during the Battle of Prague. The sculptures on the tower were replaced in 1876.

References

Towers in Prague
Gates
National Cultural Monuments of the Czech Republic
Old Town (Prague)
Prague
Tourist attractions in Prague